Tak Yong-bin (born 23 July 1962) is a North Korean former footballer. He represented North Korea on at least forty-eight occasions between 1985 and 1993, scoring twice.

Career statistics

International

International goals
Scores and results list North Korea's goal tally first, score column indicates score after each North Korea goal.

References

1962 births
Living people
North Korean footballers
North Korea international footballers
Association football defenders
Footballers at the 1990 Asian Games
1992 AFC Asian Cup players
Asian Games competitors for North Korea